The following is a timeline of the history of the city of Rouen, France.

Prior to 18th century

 5th century - Roman Catholic Archdiocese of Rouen created.
 586 - Prætextatus (bishop of Rouen) assassinated.
 841 - Town besieged by Vikings.
 911 - Rollo takes power.
 912 - Rouen becomes capital of Duchy of Normandy.
 1087 - Death of William the Conqueror at Priory of St Gervase.
 1150 - Founding charter.
 1200 - Cathedral burns down.
 1202 - Rouen Cathedral construction begins.
 1204 - Philip II of France in power.
 1210 - Rouen Castle built.
 1306 - Jews expelled.
 1318 - Church of St. Ouen construction begins.
 1382 - Harelle revolt.
 1389 - Tour de la Grosse Horloge built.
 1418 - Siege of Rouen.
 1419 - Henry V of England takes power.
 1431 - Joan of Arc executed.
 1432 - Church of Saint-Maclou construction begins (approximate date).
 1449 - Charles VII of France takes power.
 1486 - Puy (society)  formed.
 1487 - Printing press in operation.
 1499
 Parlement de Normandie begins meeting in Rouen.
 Exchequer of Normandy installed.
 1508 - Palais de Justice built.
 1550 - Entry into Rouen of Henri II and Catherine de' Medici.
 1562 - Siege of Rouen.
 1583 - Codified Norman law published.
 1591 - Siege of Rouen.
 1593 - Collège de Bourbon established.
 1606 -  6 June: Birth of Pierre Corneille.
 1642 - Pascal's calculator invented.
 1673 - Rouen manufactory of porcelain in operation.

18th-19th centuries
 1703 - Chamber of Commerce created.
 1734 - School of surgery founded.
 1744 - Académie des sciences, belles-lettres et arts de Rouen founded.
 1749 -  built.
 1758 - Hospital opens.
 1785 -  newspaper begins publication.
 1790 - Rouen becomes part of the Seine Inférieure souveraineté.
 1793 - Population: 84,323.
 1801
 Musée des Beaux-Arts founded.
 1809 -  opens.
 1821 - 12 December: Birth of Gustave Flaubert.
 1828 - Muséum d'Histoire Naturelle de Rouen founded.
 1834 -  opens.
 1836 - Population: 92,083.
 1840 - Jardin des Plantes opens.
 1843 - Railway to Paris begins operating.
 1847 - Rouen-Rive-Droite station opens.
 1851 - Population: 100,265.
 1856 - Flaubert's fiction novel Madame Bovary published (set in Rouen).
 1864 - Rouen Ceramic Museum established.
 1867 - Rouen-Martainville station opens.
 1869 - Société de l'histoire de Normandie founded.
 1870 - Prussian occupation.
 1871 - Rouen Business School established.
 1874 - Église Saint-Gervais de Rouen rebuilt.
 1876 - Population: 104,902.
 1877 - Trams begin operating.
 1879 - Société de géographie de Rouen founded.
 1880 - Musee-Bibliothèque built.
 1883 - Rouen Orléans station (rail station) opens.
 1888 -  (bridge) constructed.
 1891 - Photo-club rouennais formed.
 1892 - Artist Monet begins painting cathedral series.
 1899 - FC Rouen sport club formed.

20th century

 1906 - Population: 118,459.
 1911
 Norman Museum opens.
 Population: 124,987.
 1917 - Stadium opens.
 1926 - Rubis Terminal chemical storage site established in Le Grand-Quevilly.
 1940 - June 9: German occupation begins.
 1942 - Subcamp of the Stalag 356 prisoner-of-war camp established by the Germans.
 1944
 April: Subcamp of the V SS construction brigade established. The prisoners were mostly Poles and Soviets.
 August: Subcamp of the V SS construction brigade dissolved. Surviving prisoners deported to the Mittelbau-Dora concentration camp.
 August 15: German occupation ends.
 1950 - Rouen-Les-Essarts racetrack opens.
 1953 -  established.
 1955 - Pont Boieldieu rebuilt.
 1959 - Rouen twinned with Norwich, United Kingdom.
 1965 - Archives department of Seine-Maritime building constructed.
 1966
 University of Rouen founded.
 Rouen twinned with Hanover, West Germany.
 1979 - Church of St Joan of Arc built.
 1982 - Dragons de Rouen ice hockey team formed.
 1984
 City becomes regional capital of Upper Normandy.
 Restaurant Gill in business.
 1985 - Institut National des Sciences Appliquées de Rouen established.
 1988 - Rouen Nordic Film Festival begins.
 1991 - Rouen Airport opens.
 1992 - Île Lacroix ice rink opens.
 1994 - Métro begins operating.
 1995 -  becomes mayor.
 1999
 Maritime, Fluvial and Harbour Museum opens.
 Population: 106,592.

21st century

 2001
 Transport Est-Ouest Rouennais buses begin operating.
  (concert hall) opens.
 2002 - Rouen twinned with Salerno, Italy.
 2007 - Population: 110,276.
 2008
 Pont Gustave-Flaubert (bridge) opens.
 Rouen twinned with Cleveland, USA.
 2010 - City becomes part of the Agglomeration community of Rouen-Elbeuf-Austreberthe.
 2014 - March:  held.
 2015 - December:  held.
 2016
 Rouen becomes part of Normandy (administrative region).
 Thirteen people are killed in a fire in Rouen.

See also
 History of Rouen
 
 
 History of Normandy region

other cities in the Normandy region
 Timeline of Caen
 Timeline of Le Havre

References

This article incorporates information from the French Wikipedia.

Bibliography

in English
 
 
 
 
  (+ 1889 Northern France ed.

in French
 
 
 
 
  (subject categories)

External links

 Items related to Rouen, various dates (via Europeana)
 Items related to Rouen, various dates (via Digital Public Library of America).

Rouen